Marshal Mfon Johnson  (born 12 December 1989) is a Nigerian footballer who plays for NK Opatija.

Career
Johnson began his career with Akwa United F.C. and joined on 26 May 2009 to Belgium club R. Union Saint-Gilloise who signed a two-year contract. On 24 September 2010 left R. Union Saint-Gilloise and signed with KAS Eupen.

In the summer of 2011, Johnson signed for Honvéd on loan.
In March 2018, Johnson signed a one-year contract with Armenian Premier League club FC Pyunik.

References

External links
 
NZS profile 

1989 births
Living people
People from Uyo
Nigerian footballers
Association football midfielders
Royale Union Saint-Gilloise players
Akwa United F.C. players
Expatriate footballers in Belgium
Expatriate footballers in Hungary
Nigerian expatriate sportspeople in Belgium
Slovenian PrvaLiga players
K.A.S. Eupen players
Nigerian expatriate footballers
Nigerian expatriate sportspeople in Hungary
Nemzeti Bajnokság I players
Budapest Honvéd FC players
Budapest Honvéd FC II players
Expatriate footballers in Slovenia
Expatriate footballers in Armenia
ND Gorica players
Expatriate footballers in the United Arab Emirates
NK Opatija players
Second Football League (Croatia) players
Expatriate footballers in Croatia
Nigerian expatriate sportspeople in Croatia